Madison Township is one of sixteen townships in Butler County, Iowa, USA.  As of the 2020 census, its population was 282.

Geography
According to the USGS, it contains one cemetery, Madison.

References

External links
 US-Counties.com
 City-Data.com

Townships in Butler County, Iowa
Townships in Iowa